Dorothea Warren O'Hara (August 31, 1873 – May 1972)  was an American ceramic artist who won the Lifetime Membership Prize from the National Arts Club and a gold medal at the Panama–Pacific International Exposition. She was president of the Keramic Society of Greater New York and president of the New York National Society of Craftsmen.

Biography
Dorothea Warren was born on August 31, 1873 in Kansas City, Missouri. In 1915 she won the Lifetime Membership Prize from the National Arts Club and a gold medal at the Panama–Pacific International Exposition. In 1923 she published The Art of Enameling on Porcelain. She died in May 1972 in Delray Beach, Florida.

Legacy
Her works are on display at the Metropolitan Museum of Art in New York City and the Ueno Royal Museum in Tokyo.

Works
 The Art of Enameling on Porcelain. (1912)
 Dorothea Warren O'Hara Enamels, for Decorating All Kinds of China, by the Roessler and Hasslacher Chemical Company (1920)

Footnotes

External links
Dorothea Warren O'Hara at the Metropolitan Museum of Art

1873 births
1972 deaths
American ceramists